"Painkiller" is a 2006 single by Freestylers featuring Pendulum and SirReal. It was released to promote the release of Freestylers' album Adventures in Freestyle. Pendulum had previously collaborated with Freestylers for the track "Fasten Your Seatbelt", which was released as a single and appeared on the former's 2005 album, Hold Your Colour. The single was released on 12" vinyl and on CD, with a second remix single being released on 12" vinyl.

A music video for the song exists.

Track listing

12" single 
A. "Painkiller" – 5:32
B. "Jump 'N' Twist" – 5:55
12" remix single 
A. "Painkiller"  – 6:04
B. "Painkiller"  – 5:58
CD single 
"Painkiller"  – 3:46
"Painkiller" – 5:32
"Painkiller"  – 5:58
"Painkiller"  – 6:04
"Jump 'N' Twist" – 5:55

References 

2006 songs
2006 singles
Freestylers songs
Pendulum (drum and bass band) songs
Songs written by Rob Swire